Jalovec may refer to:

 Jalovec, Prievidza in Slovakia
 Jalovec, Liptovský Mikuláš in Slovakia
 Jalovec (mountain), a mountain in Slovenia's Julian Alps